Ragıp Berke Atar (born 13 July 1999) is a Turkish professional basketball player, who plays as a center for Darüşşafaka of the Turkish Basketball Super League.

Professional career
On 27 January 2019, Atar signed with Macedonian basketball team MZT Skopje.

On July 3, 2020, he has signed with Galatasaray of the Basketbol Süper Ligi.

On June 24, 2021, he has signed with Darüşşafaka of the Turkish Basketball Super League.

References

External links
Proballers profile
Eurobasket profile

Living people
1999 births
Bandırma B.İ.K. players
Centers (basketball)
Darüşşafaka Basketbol players
Galatasaray S.K. (men's basketball) players
KK MZT Skopje players
Turkish men's basketball players